The Stars Look Down is a 1975 British television adaptation written by Alan Plater from A. J. Cronin's 1935 novel The Stars Look Down.  The Granada production was directed by Roland Joffé, Alan Grint and Howard Baker and starred Ian Hastings as David Fenwick and Susan Tracy as his wife, Jenny. Other versions include a 1940 British film and a 1971 Italian television adaptation.

Set between 1910 and 1930, the story follows the lives of people from the coal mining town of Sleescale in North East England. David Fenwick and Joe Gowlan both leave the mines hoping for better prospects, while the mine owner's son Arthur Barras comes into conflict with his father.

Episodes
The series aired in 13 one-hour episodes from 4 September 1975 to 27 November 1975.

Cast
Ian Hastings as David Fenwick
Alun Armstrong as Joe Gowlan
James Bate as Sammy Fenwick
Rod Culbertson as Hughie Fenwick
Geoffrey Davion as Stanley Millington
Basil Dignam as Richard Barras
Avril Elgar as Martha Fenwick
Adrienne Frank as Hetty Todd
Valerie Georgeson as Laura Millington
Ronald Herdman as Jim Mawson
Barbara Hickmott as Hilda Barras
Norman Jones as Robert Fenwick
David Markham as Adam Todd	
Ronald Radd as Tom Heddon
Anne Raitt as Annie Mercer
Christian Rodska as Arthur Barras
Catherine Terris as Grace Barras
Susan Tracy as Jenny Sunley
Malcolm Terris as Harry Nugent
James Garbutt as Hudspeth 
John Nightingale as Jack Reedy
Morrissey as Boy on Bicycle (extra)
George Bannister as Sammy Fenwick

References

External links
The Stars Look Down at the BFI Film & TV Database

1975 British television series debuts
1975 British television series endings
1970s British drama television series
ITV television dramas
1970s British television miniseries
Television series set in the 20th century
Television shows based on works by A. J. Cronin
Television shows based on British novels
Television series by ITV Studios
Television shows produced by Granada Television
English-language television shows